Pendergrast v Chapman [1988] 2 NZLR 177 is a cited case in New Zealand regarding the consequences of cancellation of a contract under the Contractual Remedies Act 1979.

Background
Chapman agreed to purchase the Pendergrast's Epsom property for $650,000, $40,000 of the deposit to be paid via a post dated cheque.

The post dated cheque later dishonoured, and as a result, Pendergrast cancelled the contract and sued Chapman for the $40,000 unpaid deposit. Chapman defended the claim that under the section 8(3) of the Contractual Remedies Act, once a contract is cancelled, neither party is obliged to perform the contract any further.

Held
The court ruled that the Act only stopped future obligations, not obligations that had already fallen due, such as the deposit here. Chapman was ruled liable to pay the deposit.

References

High Court of New Zealand cases
New Zealand contract case law
1987 in New Zealand law
1987 in case law